Ronald Hornby (13 April 1914 – 13 July 1962) was a professional footballer who played for Stalybridge Celtic, Rochdale and Burnley.

References

Ron Hornby's profile
Ron Hornby at Post War Football League database

1914 births
1962 deaths
English footballers
English Football League players
Association football wingers
Stalybridge Celtic F.C. players
Rochdale A.F.C. players
Burnley F.C. players
Huddersfield Town A.F.C. wartime guest players